This is a list of characters in the American film Jimmy Neutron: Boy Genius, the animated television series spin-off The Adventures of Jimmy Neutron, Boy Genius and other media.

Main

Cast table

James Isaac Neutron (voiced by Debi Derryberry) is an extremely intelligent boy who uses scientific knowledge and inventions to solve problems, most of which he causes himself. He is 10 years old in the first season, 11 in the second season, and 12 in the third and final season. His name is a reference to Isaac Newton. He is the son of Judy and Hugh Neutron. Although he is a genius, he is a kid at heart and has more often than not proven so. Due to the events in Retroville, Jimmy is key in resolving most situations. Jimmy will usually exclaim "Gotta think..." when he begins formulating a solution for the dilemma, accessing a vast wealth of information gathered during the dilemma. Once he has developed a plan, he usually exclaims "Brain blast!", his catchphrase. His best friends are Sheen Estevez, Carl Wheezer and his robot dog Goddard. He and Cindy Vortex have a dislike for each other, although it is revealed in later episodes that they secretly love each other. Neutron is usually seen wearing a red T-shirt with his yellow trademark atom symbol on it, blue jeans, and white Chuck-Taylor Converse All-Star sneakers, but blue shorts and brown shoes in the film. He has blue eyes and a huge mass of brown hair that is considered "anti-gravity" and is in a whipped-up form, earning him many nicknames from classmates (especially Cindy), such as "Whippy-Dip" from his clone Evil Jimmy, and "Señor Fudge-Head" and "Buzz Adams" (from Cosmo in The Jimmy Timmy Power Hour). In addition to his parents, several of his other relatives have also appeared on the show.
Ramón Juarrea "Sheen" Estevez (voiced by Jeffrey Garcia) is Jimmy's slightly older, hyperactive, addled best friend, characterized by his unhealthy obsession with the fictional superhero "UltraLord" and the television series, video games, and merchandising inspired by UltraLord. Sheen, who wears an UltraLord T-shirt, has amassed a collection of UltraLord memorabilia and also created a website dedicated to the superhero. Sheen lives with his father and grandmother. Sheen's father makes a brief appearance in season one, although his face is not shown. Sheen is noted for his extreme, constant bouts of hyperactivity, which he demonstrates multiple times per episode, along with his misdirected, limited intelligence and short attention span, to the annoyance of his peers. Alongside UltraLord, Sheen also appears to be interested in superheroes in general and in typical masculine subjects such as wrestling, and is strongly infatuated with Libby Folfax, becoming her boyfriend by the time of the program's conclusion.  Sheen would later star in his own spin-off show, Planet Sheen, which premiered in 2010. In this series, he goes into Jimmy's lab and steals his new rocket ship, which crash lands on the planet Zeenu. Due to the series being short-lived, he is never shown returning to Earth. However, in "The Tomorrow Boys", a 2005 episode of The Adventures of Jimmy Neutron: Boy Genius that involves time travel, Sheen is shown to be living on Earth in the future. (Which implies that he does make it back to Earth from Zeenu as of his best friends rescue him sometime after the show.)  His full name is a reference to the last names of both stage name and real names of father-son actors Martin Sheen, Charlie Sheen, and Emilio Estevez.
Carlton Ulysses Wheezer (voiced by Rob Paulsen in the film and TV series and Wally Wingert in the 2002 PS2 and GameCube game) is a bespectacled dimwitted boy and one of Jimmy's best friends. Carl and his parents have numerous allergies, at times even to things that are incapable of triggering allergic reactions. He passionately loves llamas, hanging posters of them throughout his room and playing llama-themed video games. His passion for llamas is often used as a running gag throughout the series. He admits to having romantic interest in Jimmy's mom, as shown throughout a multitude of episodes. His crush on Judy becomes so extreme that he is shown an interest in exterminating Judy's husband, Hugh Neutron. An extraterrestrial character named Doppy, with similarities to Carl, is a main character in Planet Sheen. His extreme obsession for the llama originated when his parents expanded their cable lineup and he became devoted to a show called Llama Boy The Super Hero. Since his obsession began he has gone to great lengths to express his love for them, going as far as to join a fan club called The Llama Love Society, which he likely created himself. It is worth noting, Carl is afraid of lima beans, germs, and scary stories. He is also known to have asthma and use an inhaler, and he is very stressed about his multitude of allergies and is terrified of getting any sort of illness, similarly to his parents. Also, when he is tired, his mom makes him warm milk, rubs his tummy, and sings "nani nani nani", which he blurts out in an episode.  A recurring gag throughout the series involves Wheezer bursting into an improvised off-key song to express his emotions, whether good or bad. 
Cynthia Aurora "Cindy" Vortex (voiced by Carolyn Lawrence) is a blonde-haired girl with green eyes, wears a fading-green shirt with stripes and wears her hair in a ponytail with her trademark bangs. In her debut, she wore a salmon-pink shirt with black pants and salmon-pink shoes and wore her hair in pigtails. She is a practitioner of tai chi along with her father. Libby is her closest friend and compatriot. She has a dog named Humphrey, who is seen in many episodes, usually accompanying her. She is Jimmy Neutron's female counterpart and arch-rival yet love interest but in the 2006 episode, "Lady Sings the News", Jimmy and Cindy officially start dating, which was predicted in earlier episodes like "Win Lose and Kaboom!". In "The Tomorrow Boys", Jimmy, Sheen, and Carl traveled to the future, where future Jimmy revealed he and Cindy were married. It is unclear whether this is the true future since the gang changed the past by the end of the episode. In The Jimmy Timmy Power Hour trilogy, Cindy has a relationship with Timmy Turner. Cindy's mother, who was born in France and loves French food, has high standards for Cindy and expects her to follow in her footsteps. Her father is an accountant who makes an appearance in the episode "Make Room for Daddy-O."
Libby Folfax (voiced by Crystal Scales) is an African-American girl who wears a bob of box braids, a striped pink shirt, jeans, and brown shoes. Her debut outfit was a turquoise patterned dress and a straightened ponytail. She is a dancer and especially adores funk music, emo rock, and boy bands. Early in the series, Libby dislikes Jimmy and his friends and often sides with her best friend Cindy, but as the series continues, Libby become more attached to Jimmy, Carl, and Sheen. In "Beach Party Mummy," while exploring an Egyptian tomb, Libby and her friends discover that Libby strongly resembles Egyptian Queen Hasabataslapya. During the episode, Libby masqueraded as the queen in order to distract a group of revived mummies (as the ancient portrait of the queen strongly resembles Libby). For the rest of the series, Libby kept the new braided bob hairstyle in homage to her likely ancestor. After Sheen professes his crush to her in "Love Potion 976/J," Libby takes a romantic interest in him. Libby's father appears in the episodes "Make Room for Daddy-O", "Men at Work", and "Win Lose and Kaboom". He has also made cameo appearances in several episodes. Libby's mother (also voiced by Scales) appears in "Journey to the Center of Carl" and "The N-Men".
Goddard (voiced by Frank Welker) is a robotic dog, invented by Jimmy. He is loyal to his owner and often accompanies him on his adventures, including to different planets. Jimmy has programmed Goddard to arrive when called via Jimmy's phone. Goddard has various features including self-propelled flight, storage, and a rocket propelled bicycle-like transportation, complete with handle bars. Jimmy often uses Goddard to help weigh options for his dilemmas, which Goddard displays on a computer monitor covered normally by his breastplate. He has mostly the disposition of a normal dog, but occasionally uses voice clips to communicate. Jimmy can have Goddard "play dead", which causes him to self-destruct. Despite being blown to pieces, Goddard can instantly reconstruct himself back to normal from the scrap without any assistance. This has become a running gag for him. He is named after the late famous American physicist, Robert H. Goddard.
Hugh Beaumont Neutron (voiced by Mark DeCarlo) is Jimmy Neutron's father and Judy's husband, is portrayed as a clueless, dimwitted, but good-natured man who works in an automotive assembly plant. He wears circular glasses, a sweater-vest with a white shirt and red tie, blue pants, and brown shoes. He frequently offers advice to Jimmy in an attempt to be a better father. Ducks are Hugh's favorite hobby; he enjoys collecting and buffing duck decoys, displaying them around the house. Hugh also professes an obsession for pie, especially those baked by Judy Neutron. In one episode, Hugh invented a holiday called "Pule" (a combination of Pie and Yule) when Jimmy accidentally causes Christmas to be replaced by messing with Santa's atoms. In another episode, Hugh gets hooked on shows from outer space. This proves vital as his knowledge of these shows ended up saving Earth when he had to answer a question related to one of the shows. The character is named after actor Hugh Beaumont, who played Ward Cleaver in Leave it to Beaver. His voice was in part an impression of one of the series producers, Paul Marshal.
Judith "Judy" Neutron (voiced by Megan Cavanagh) is a homemaker and baker who has auburn hair in an exaggerated 1950s fringe hairdo and green eyes. She married Hugh Neutron, and is Jimmy's mother. She wears a green sleeveless dress with small pink polka-dots, along with a white pearl necklace, high-heel dress shoes, red lipstick, and has a mole on the left side of her face. She is a responsible parent for her son Jimmy, and often professes a similar role for her husband Hugh. Regardless, she has stated that she appreciates her union to Hugh and is happy in their marriage.

Recurring
Betty Quinlan (voiced by Kath Soucie) is Jimmy's first crush. She is nice to him, and has the unintentional ability to make him do things he normally would not do. Betty told Cindy that she is fully aware of Jimmy and Cindy's feelings for each other, and to "Just relax and keep out of my face. He's all yours".
Also known as the "boy from fairytale land" or the "boy with the funny name", Bolbi Stroganovsky (voiced by Phil LaMarr) is the strange resident exchange student from Backhairistan. He normally speaks broken English, but is shown to have a surprisingly good Shakespearean acting voice when auditioning for a play. He dresses in stereotypical Eastern European garb and has an accent of indeterminate origin, and joins Jimmy, Carl, Sheen, Cindy, and Libby to the game show in "Win, Lose, and Kaboom!" He states that "Super-Kabobby Man" is the most famous hero of Backhairistan. It is known that he has a blond sister who looks just like him in "Crouching Jimmy, Hidden Sheen." He has a musical pet goat named Yurri.
Winfred Fowl (voiced by Andrea Martin) is the teacher for Jimmy and his friends, who frequently squawks like a chicken when speaking. In an episode of the first season, Jimmy inadvertently turned Miss Fowl into a giant plant monster after he revived a 64-million-year-old plant. Because of Jimmy, Fowl was later shrunk down to normal.
Nicholas "Nick" Dean (voiced by Candi Milo) is the "cool" kid at school who is often seen on a skateboard, doing dangerous tricks. He does not participate in his school's show and tell activities and sometimes arrives at school five minutes before dismissal. Nick is obsessed with styling his hair, and is considered very handsome by all girls in the school. He is of Brazilian American descent, and his mother speaks Portuguese and English. Nick sometimes breaks his leg while riding his skateboard; when he does so, he usually lets out a high pitched girl-like scream. Nick was originally going to be part of the regular group of characters, similar to his role in the film. He is one of the town's wealthiest children, living in a 92-room mansion, with a bowling alley, maids' quarters, a screening room, and a soda parlor. He can also sing operatic German, and can style his hair without using his hands. In the movie, he was almost always seen with a purple lollipop in his mouth. He is very strong; in one episode, he was able to beat up Jimmy, Carl, and Sheen and throw them all into a dumpster. However, he can be a coward at times and even a wimp as in the movie when he confronted Poultra, he ran away screaming. He wore a sleeves jacket for the first half of the series then switched to a leather jacket. Nick is the second male character (along with Jimmy) who is voiced by a woman.
Principal Willoughby (voiced by Rob Paulsen) is the flamboyant, Broadway-loving Principal at Lindbergh Elementary School. He is also somewhat overweight. He directed Macbeth in Space and was extremely giddy about it. He shows fierce anger when one of his shows gets ruined. However, he is a truly good person, albeit forgetful at times. He is energetic and enthusiastic. He seems to genuinely care about his scholars, and has clearly taken the time to get to know each and every one. He has a sister named Eunice who looks like the late Albert Einstein, and comments on always getting them confused. He appears a handful of times.
Sam Melvick (voiced by Billy West) is the disgruntled and hot-tempered owner of the Candy Bar, an ice cream shop in Retroville where Jimmy and his friends often meet. He frequently says "Yeah!" at the end of his sentences.
UltraLord (voiced by Jim Cummings in the film and TV series and Rob Paulsen in the PC 2001 video game) is a superhero for whom Sheen has an unhealthy obsession and who stars in a TV series of the same name. His main enemy is Robo-Fiend (also voiced by Cummings). Sheen has the largest UltraLord action figure collection and is offended when other characters call them "Dolls". In the film, Sheen is tricked by Cindy into showing his school class a rare, never-to-be-seen condition Ultralord action figure when Cindy asks how Sheen knew it was in the condition box. Also in the film, Sheen meets an UltraLord impersonator at Retroland and gets an "Ultra-mask" from him. Sheen has been seen wearing the Ultra-Mask throughout the show.

Villains
King Goobot V (voiced by Patrick Stewart in the film, S. Scott Bullock in the TV series and Joe Whyte in the video game) is the Yolkian King who appears in the 2001 film and the episodes "The Eggpire Strikes Back" and "League of Villains". He had his armada kidnap all the parents in Retroville and attempted to sacrifice them to the Yolkian god, Poultra, a giant monstrous chicken. He was stopped by Jimmy and all the other children. He later returned in "The Eggpire Strikes Back" wanting to make amends with Retroville while claiming that Poultra made them do those awful things. This ploy was part of King Goobot's plot to get into Jimmy's lab and use his cloning machine to recreate Poultra. King Goobot was defeated again by Jimmy. In "The League of Villains", King Goobot formed the titular team by gathering Junkman, Baby Eddie, Grandma Taters, Eustace Strytch, Professor Finbarr Calamitous, Beautiful Gorgeous, and the Space Bandits in a plot to get revenge on Jimmy Neutron.
Ooblar (voiced by Martin Short in the film, Paul Greenberg in the TV series and Mark DeCarlo in the video game) is the Yolkian sidekick and younger brother of King Goobot. He no longer serves as Goobot's assistant because in the "League of Villains", Goobot said he was traded for sulfur butter.
The Fleet Commander (voiced by Rob Paulsen) of Goobot's forces who only appears as the main antagonist in the PC version of Jimmy Neutron: Boy Genius. He pays homage to Darth Vader, thanks to his mannerisms and armor.
Poultra (vocal effects provided by Frank Welker) is a giant chicken-like monstrosity whom the Yolkians worship as a goddess. She only appears in the original film and in the hour-long TV episode "The Eggpire Strikes Back". Her name is a play on the word "poultry".
Professor Finbarr Calamitous (voiced by Tim Curry) is a mad scientist and Ms. Fowl's former student. He is Jimmy's nemesis and, due to his popularity with fans, eventually becomes the show's main antagonist. Professor Finbarr Calamitous was once a brilliant boy who could never finish anything, not even a sentence. The only thing he could finish was a robotic suit, although he did not consider it finished since he did not put a bathroom into it. He later overcomes this to some extent, and Finbarr Calamitous is heard completing sentences as seen in "Operation: Rescue Jet Fusion", "The Great Egg Heist", and "The Jimmy Timmy Power Hour 2: When Nerds Collide". However, he still has a habit of not finishing his plans, or more specifically, he is able to carry out his plans but does not plan on what he is going to do after that. He has also been the main antagonist in the video games Nicktoons Unite! (2005) and Nicktoons: Attack of the Toybots (2007) where he faced Jimmy Neutron, Timmy Turner, Danny Phantom, SpongeBob SquarePants, and other Nicktoon characters. In two separate episodes, Calamitous used disguises that initially fooled Jimmy and the other children. In the second season, Calamitous disguised himself as Princess Guan Qi "Peggy" Tsu (voiced by Ming-Na Wen). In the third season, Calamitous disguised himself as Quentin Smithee (voiced by Jim Meskimen), a demanding film director who cast Jimmy and the other children in a film. During production, Calamitous made several failed attempts to kill the children.
Beautiful Gorgeous (voiced by Wendie Malick) is an evil villain who is the daughter of Jimmy's enemy, Professor Calamitous. Her childhood dream was to become the person who "puts those little plastic things on the ends of shoelaces". She appears in "Operation: Rescue Jet Fusion", "My Big Fat Spy Wedding", and "The League of Villains".  Beautiful Gorgeous is a playable character in the 2008 video game SpongeBob SquarePants featuring Nicktoons: Globs of Doom.
The Space Bandits are three reptilian aliens who Jimmy and his friends first encountered when mining for diamonds in space. In "The League of Villains", the Space Bandits are among the villains recruited by King Goobot V to assist in his revenge on Jimmy Neutron. They later defect to Jimmy's side and are revealed to speak a reptilian language where they persuaded a Tyrannosaurus to go after Baby Eddie.
Zix (voiced by Maurice LaMarche impersonating Jon Lovitz) is the leader of the Space Bandits. He appears in the episodes A Beautiful Mine, Men at Work, The Incredible Shrinking Town and The League of Villains.
Travoltron (voiced by Jeff Bennett impersonating John Travolta) is a member of the Space Bandits. He appears in the episodes A Beautiful Mine, Men at Work, The Incredible Shrinking Town and The League of Villains). He is a caricature of John Travolta.
Tee (voiced by Kevin Michael Richardson impersonating Mr. T, understudied by Maurice LaMarche in "Men at Work") is the third Space Bandit. He appears with his friends in the episodes A Beautiful Mine, Men at Work, The Incredible Shrinking Town, and The League of Villains. He turns towards good with the other space bandits in The League of Villains. He enjoys hugging, and dreams of opening a dress shop. Tee also hates it when people call him stupid, and though he was originally mute, he became known for exclaiming "Fool!" after his sentences when he was given spoken dialogue in "The Incredible Shrinking Town," due to him being a caricature of Mr. T.
The Nanobots appeared in the episodes Safety First, Return of the Nanobots, and Fundemonium). They consist of an orange large Nanobot (voiced by Daran Norris) and a red thin Nanobot (voiced by Tom Kenny)
Evil Jimmy Neutron (voiced by Rob Paulsen) was one of several clones created by Jimmy to do his chores while he harvested moon rocks. The clones are frozen by Jimmy using ice crystals after they cause trouble, although Evil Jimmy escapes and later returns in "The Trouble with Clones", in which Jimmy attempts to convert him into a nice person to have him do chores. Evil Jimmy creates an evil clone of the Earth, causing the real Earth to disappear. The original Jimmy travels to the evil Earth and reverses the effects, with the cloned Earth and Evil Jimmy being sucked into the Dark Matter Dimension.
Eustace Strytch (voiced by Rob Paulsen) is a rich, snobby boy seen in "Billion Dollar Boy", "King of Mars", "The League of Villains", and "The Jimmy Timmy Power Hour 3: The Jerkinators". He had a cameo appearance in "Attack of the Twonkies". He is the bitter rival of Jimmy, and has an extremely annoying laugh.
Professor Crank (voiced by Dan Castellaneta) appears in the episode Operation: Rescue Jet Fusion.
The Junkman (voiced by Charlie Adler) is a filthy extraterrestrial creature who deals in fixing up and selling refuse products throughout the galaxy. He first appears in the second season, when he attempts to recycle Brobot's parents and sell their parts for profit. He has a dog named Roxy, whom Goddard has a crush on. The Junkman later returns in several additional episodes where he made cameos in some of them. In "The League of Villains", Junkman is among the villains recruited by King Goobot V to assist in his revenge on Jimmy Neutron. Due to one of Jimmy's inventions, Junkman falls in love with Beautiful Gorgeous much to the dismay of Professor Calamitous.
The Twonkies (vocal effects provided by Frank Welker) species of small, puff ball-like aliens. One is found on a comet, and it multiplies once Jimmy brings it back to Earth. Its offspring are kept as pets by the people of Retroville until their dark secret is discovered: they turn into vicious monsters every time they hear music. Sheen's terrible singing voice, however, lulls them to sleep. The Twonkies can combine themselves into a large eight-foot tall seemingly invincible monster that can only be subdued by Sheen's bad singing. Jimmy manages to capture most of the Twonkies, and sends the merged beast back to its comet; but he forgets Sheen's, which escapes and reproduces asexually. As a recurring gag, the Twonkie's offspring are seen throughout the show but unnoticed by the characters, such as in a student's locker, in a chair at Jet Fusion's wedding, and behind Carl after he is prosecuted.
Meldar Prime (speaking voice by Tim Allen and singing voice provided by Jess Harnell) is the host of the TV show Intergalactic Showdown that appears in "Win, Lose, and Kaboom"!
Edward "Eddie" Neutron (voiced by Mark DeCarlo) is Jimmy's infant evil genius cousin and the son of Kari and Newt, whom looks identical to Granny Neutron as an infant. Eddie believes that he is much smarter than Jimmy. He planted bombs inside gifts and a cake during a Neutron family reunion and birthday party in an attempt to kill the family and inherit their money, making sure that Jimmy would be blamed for a crime that Jimmy has not committed. His plan was foiled and his motive was exposed leading to Eddie being taken away by his mother to be dealt with.  Eddie appears in "Clash of the Cousins" and "The League of Villains".
Grandma Taters (voiced by Edie McClurg) is a sweet-seeming old lady who is actually a hostile alien. Through a television series starring herself, she tried to hypnotize the citizens of Retroville into behaving as cheerful zombies. Featured in "One of Us" and "The League of Villains".
Buford Lee Stormshuckle (voiced by Bill Farmer) is the Southern American prison warden of a correctional facility who framed Jimmy for a bank heist. He never reveals why he framed Jimmy. He taunts Jimmy by pseudo-offering him a glass of ice cold lemonade. When Sheen and Carl unsuccessfully tried to free Jimmy, he arrested them too. However, Jimmy and his friends blinded him, allowing them to escape. Buford puts out a $10,000 reward for their capture. He was fired from his job and arrested after Jimmy proved to the police that he was the real bank robber. As punishment, Buford must clean up trash. After Jimmy taunts Buford, he vows to get revenge on Jimmy. Buford appears only in "Who Framed Jimmy Neutron?"
Dr. Sydney Orville Moist (voiced by Jeff Bennett) is a paranoid dance-crazy scientist who works in a secret underwater lair in the Bahama Quadrangle, making evil henchmen out of algae. He appears in the episode "The Evil Beneath". Dr. Moist later collaborated with Professor Calamitous in "The Jimmy Timmy Power Hour 2: When Nerds Collide" briefly before being betrayed and ejected for failing to keep an eye out for Jimmy.
Shirley (voiced by Jeff Garlin) is a villain created by Jimmy Neutron and Timmy Turner in The Jimmy Timmy Power Hour 3: The Jerkinators.  He is created out of boredom of defeating the same, easy villains in the hopes of having a more difficult, challenging one to fight.  Although he is the main villain of the movie, he at first acts humble, polite, and even dimwitted. It is only when Jimmy and Timmy abandon him at a mall that he becomes evil.

Other
Other characters in The Adventures of Jimmy Neutron: Boy Genius are listed below:
April (voiced by Alyssa Milano) is a Gorlock, a race of alien creatures that have green skin and tusks. The Gorlocks belong to one of four participating groups on Intergalactic Showdown; they usually win challenges with the use of brute strength and force. April made one appearance on the show in the episode "Win, Lose, or Kaboom!". In fear of her planet's safety, she had performed a seal of trust with Jimmy which resembled a kiss. Cindy had observed this and was jealous. Jimmy's hormones had kicked in after that, and he had hoped for another kiss from her when the adventure was over. He and April would send messages via space rock after that. Her real name is Chee Aaaaaaaaaah Doik!, but she hates this name and threatens anyone who calls her by it.
Britney Tenelli (voiced by Candi Milo) is a friend of Cindy and Libby who is also a backup dancer with them. She wears a pink and white shirt with her stomach exposed, a pink jacket, pink pants, and light brown shoes. Her blonde hair is braided in pigtails and her eyes are greyish-blue. Britney usually appears as a background character but occasionally hangs around with Cindy and Libby.
Brobot (voiced by Paul Greenberg) is a robotic brother that Jimmy created after feeling lonely. However, Jimmy quickly became annoyed with Brobot. Although Brobot irritates Jimmy, it is shown that he cares about Brobot; when Jimmy disconnects him, he cries "What have I done?" Jimmy decides to send Brobot to live on the moon with robotic parents, Popbot (voiced by Jim Cummings) and Mombot. Brobot and his parents return in an episode of the second season, when Popbot and Mombot are kidnapped by the Junkman, who plans to recycle them and sell their parts for a profit. Brobot later returns in "The League of Villains".
Butch (voiced by Rob Paulsen) is a slightly slack jawed bully. Butch may have a softer side as he is seen in one episode clearing his anger with stacking sticks. In the beginning of the episode "Jimmy Goes to College," Jimmy uses sophisticated words to describe his unstable molecules and Butch holds his head, saying "Big words! They hurt! They hurt!"
VOX (voiced by Megan Cavanaugh) is Jimmy's computer. She is rarely heard in later seasons.
Carl's parents (both voiced by Rob Paulsen) who are very over protective and share many of Carl's allergies and hypochondria. In one episode Mr. Wheezer stated that he was allergic to ice; this would lead to an allergy to water. In "The Mighty Wheezers," Mr. and Mrs. Wheezer also happen to be allergic to almost every kind of food (including salt), eating an edible substitute matter instead. At night, they do stretches while making weird noises before dinner, participate in a "good family gargle before bedtime at 7:30pm," and instead of watching television, they (along with their son) sit on the couch and sing "sitting and singing" numerous times before bed.
Mayor Quador (voiced by Mark DeCarlo in "Normal Boy", Jim Cummings in later episodes) is the Mayor of Retroville. He is modeled after Clark Gable.
Coach Gruber (voiced by Jim Belushi) is the gym teacher at Lindbergh Elementary School.
Hilgo (voiced by Megan Cavanagh) is a muscular Russian woman who appeared in different roles. In "Time is Money", Hilgo appeared as the Neutron family's maid after Jimmy persuaded Hugh's past counterpart to make a wise investment. In "Nightmare in Retroville", Hilgo was part of an angry mob assembled by Sam and Ms. Fowl. In "Return of the Nanobots", Hilgo appeared as a lunch lady at Lindbergh Elementary School.
Officer Tubbs (voiced by Frank Welker in most episodes and Rob Paulsen in "The Great Egg Heist") is a police officer who is not very bright. In some episodes, he would often be seen arresting the bad guys that Jimmy defeats.
Cap'n Betty is an odd sailor who knows about a monster that Jimmy is trying to reveal to be false. He appears in "Monster Hunt", "My Big Fat Spy Wedding", and has numerous cameos throughout the series, many of them well-hidden. He is a parody of Quint from Jaws.
Commander Baker (voiced by Michael Clarke Duncan) is an African American who is the Big Top Secret Organization commander. It is stated in "My Big Fat Spy Wedding" he did something illegal when he implanted a tracking chip inside Beautiful Gorgeous's head. He is also at a constant upset by all the embarrassing pictures of him when he is showing Jimmy his mission. He appears in the episodes "Operation: Rescue Jet Fusion" and "My Big Fat Spy Wedding".
Corky Shimatzu (voiced by Billy West) is a famous Japanese big-shot television producer, whose catchphrase is "Super Fantastic!"
Ernest Abercrombie (voiced by Mark DeCarlo) is a military general who appears in two episodes. In the first season, he is shown as having a lack of knowledge about the military as Retroville faces the threat of Miss Fowl, who has become an overgrown monster, inadvertently because of Jimmy. His second appearance occurs in the third season, when he detains Jimmy and his friends after they obtain superhero powers and are mistaken by Retroville citizens as mutants.
Flippy is Hugh's dummy and a semi-villain. He was used as firewood to ward off the Twonkies in the season-three premiere episode, "Attack of the Twonkies". He also appears in "Flippy".
Hank McSpanky is the founder of a chain of fast food restaurants named McSpanky's. It is said that he is Scottish. He once met Jimmy's father, with whom he almost went into business.
Jet Fusion (voiced by Christian Slater) is an athlete, actor, and spy who is admired by Jimmy, Carl, and Sheen. He appears in the episodes "Operation: Rescue Jet Fusion" and "My Big Fat Spy Wedding". His name is a play on James Bond.

Neutron family
Besides Jimmy, Judy, Hugh, and Eddie, this section lists the known relatives of the Neutron family. As revealed in "Clash of the Cousins", Jimmy is disliked by most of the relatives that appear in that episode due to the fact that he "brings danger to the town" until he exposed Eddie's plot.
Amanda Neutron (voiced by Tress MacNeille) Jimmy's wealthy great-aunt and Hugh's aunt. Amanda originally hates Jimmy because he "brings danger to the town". She reconciled with him after he revealed his baby cousin Eddie's evil plan to harm the family. Amanda appears only in the 2005 episode "Clash of the Cousins".
Kari Neutron (voiced by Tress MacNeille) is Jimmy's aunt, Hugh's sister and Baby Eddie's mother. Like the rest of Jimmy's cousins and aunts, she hates him for "nearly destroying the town". She was completely horrified and fainted when Jimmy attacked Baby Eddie. When she woke up, she was shocked to discover her baby speaking full sentences. She reconciles with Jimmy and apologizes to him and his parents for little Eddie trying to destroy them all. She appears only in the episode "Clash of the Cousins".
Annabelle Neutron (voiced by Tress MacNeille) is Jimmy's paranoid, insane, and brown-haired cousin. She suffers from many phobias. This was evident when Carl touched and talked to her when she was sorting toothpicks. Annabelle appears only in the episode "Clash of the Cousins".
Gomer Neutron (voiced by Mark DeCarlo) is Jimmy's cousin on Hugh's side who is extremely stupid and plays ping pong with a ball that is covered in saliva and is known as his "spit ball". Unlike the other relatives, Gomer has no issues against Jimmy. Gomer appears only in "Clash of The Cousins".
Granny Neutron (voiced by Phyllis Diller in season one and Rose Marie in season four) is Hugh's mother and Jimmy's paternal grandmother. Jimmy once turned her into a baby in "Granny Baby".
Newton "Newt" Neutron (voiced by Mark DeCarlo) is Jimmy's uncle, Kari's husband and a seemingly, mild-mannered, semi middle aged man who is Eddie's father. Like Jimmy's other cousins and aunts, he hates Jimmy for nearly destroying the town. He has black-brown hair. Only appears in "Clash of the Cousins". Newton is modeled after Keith Alcorn.

References

Lists of characters in American television animation
Animated characters
Jimmy Neutron
Characters
Jimmy Neutron
Television characters introduced in 1998
Animated characters introduced in 1998
Television characters introduced in 2001
Animated characters introduced in 2001
Television characters introduced in 2002
Animated characters introduced in 2002
Jimmy Neutron characters